Janice Giegler is a Republican member of the Connecticut House of Representatives. She was first elected in 2002. She retired in 2016.

References

External links

Republican Party members of the Connecticut House of Representatives
Women state legislators in Connecticut
Living people
Year of birth missing (living people)
21st-century American politicians
21st-century American women politicians